Hazed Dream is the third studio album by American rock band Psychic Ills. It was released on October 18, 2011, by Sacred Bones Records.

Critical reception

At Metacritic, which assigns a weighted rating out of 100 to reviews from mainstream critics, the album has an average score of 67 based on 4 reviews, indicating "generally favorable reviews". Alex Young of Consequence described Hazed Dream as a "plodding, dusty kind of psych that comes standard with phased guitars, droning organs, and a slurred and sparse percussive backbone."

Track listing

References

2011 albums
Psychic Ills albums
Sacred Bones Records albums